= Ned Shera =

American politician (born 1931)

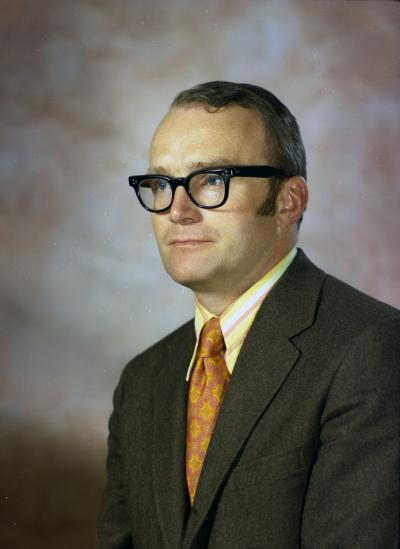
- Shera in 1971

Member of the Washington House of Representatives for the 28th district
- In office 1969–1973

Personal details
- Born: 1931 (age 94–95) Seattle, Washington, U.S.
- Party: Republican
- Occupation: Insurance broker

Ned Shera (born 1931) is an American former politician in the state of Washington. He served the 28th district from 1969 to 1973.
